Legally Blonde: Original Motion Picture Soundtrack is the soundtrack album to the 2001 film Legally Blonde, starring Reese Witherspoon, Selma Blair, Luke Wilson and Victor Garber. It was released on July 13, 2001, by A&M Records.

The album was nominated for the Satellite Award for Best Original Score.

Track listing

Charts

References

2001 soundtrack albums
A&M Records soundtracks
Albums produced by Patrick Leonard
Albums produced by Rob Schnapf
Albums produced by Rockwilder
Albums produced by Ron Fair
Comedy film soundtracks
Legally Blonde (franchise)